The 1977 FIM Motocross World Championship was the 21st F.I.M. Motocross Racing World Championship season.

Summary
Heikki Mikkola rejoined the 500cc class in 1977 after winning the 1976 250cc world championship. Now riding for the Yamaha factory racing team, he continued his old rivalry with Suzuki's Roger De Coster. Mikkola won 12 motos to clinch the title ahead of Suzuki teammates De Coster and Gerrit Wolsink. Brad Lackey switched to the Honda racing team and became the first American to score an overall victory in a 500cc motocross world championship Grand Prix when he won the British Grand Prix.

Bengt Åberg competed in the 500cc world championship on a highly modified four stroke Yamaha XT500 built in collaboration with former world champions Torsten Hallman and Sten Lundin. Åberg rode the bike to a victory in the first moto of the 1977 500cc Luxembourg Grand Prix and ended the season ranked 9th in the final world championship standings. After five seasons racing in the 250cc class, Håkan Andersson competed in the 500cc class for Montesa and finished the season in fifth place.

Guennady Moisseev won his second 250cc world championship as KTM swept the top three positions with Vladimir Kavinov finishing in second place and André Malherbe taking third place in the final standings. Suzuki's Gaston Rahier won the 125cc class for a third consecutive year.

Grands Prix

500cc

250cc

125cc

Final standings

References

External links
 

FIM Motocross World Championship season
Motocross World Championship seasons